Cushing is an unincorporated community in Cushing Township, Morrison County, Minnesota, United States.  The community is located along U.S. Highway 10 near Morrison County Road 5, Bear Road.  Nearby places include Randall, Little Falls, and Motley.

The community is home to a post office, a park, a bar, and one church.  The town hall for surrounding Cushing Township is located at Cushing.  The BNSF Railway passes through the community.

History
Cushing was platted in 1907. According to Warren Upham, the community was probably named after Caleb Cushing, a politician from Massachusetts.

Tourism

Lake Alexander is located in Cushing. Several resorts, including the Silver Moon, Ray's Resort, and The Shady Inn were popular summer campgrounds and rentals on "Lake Alex" in the 1950's through the 1990's. A local favorite, The Blue Front Resort, boasted overnight and seasonal camping, in addition to four cabins, a store, and a 3/2 bar with a jukebox, pool table, and pinball machines. All resorts have since closed to the public.

References

Unincorporated communities in Morrison County, Minnesota
Unincorporated communities in Minnesota